Wit Dąbal (born 26 September 1955) is a Polish cinematographer.

Life and work 
A graduate of the cinematography department of the Łódź Film School, Dąbal is winner of numerous film awards and distinctions, including the Cinematography Awards at the Polish Film Festival in 1984 for the film entitled "Wir" and Prix Italia in the category of TV programs for the picture entitled "From Moscow to Pietuszek with Vieniedikt Yerofeyev" (Z Moskwy do Pietuszek z Wieniediktem Jerofiejewem).

Filmography 
 1995 – Wielki tydzień 
 1992 – Sauna 
 1990 – Z Moskwy do Pietuszek z Wieniediktem Jerofiejewem
 1988 – Alchemik
 1986 – Cudowne dziecko
 1985 – Medium
 1983 – Kartka z podróży
 1981 – Wahadełko

Awards and distinctions 
 1983 – Złote Grono Award for cinematography for the film "Kartka z podróży" at the Lubuskie Film Summer Festival)
 1984 – Cinematography Award at the Polish Film Festival
 1985 – Nagroda Artystyczna Młodych im. Stanisława Wyspiańskiego (Stanisław Wyspiański's Youth Art Award) II degree for achievements in the field of cinematography presented in "Kartka z podróży" and "Wir")
 1995 – Award ("Tytan" Award for cinematography for the "EB" commercial film at the "Crackfilm" Advertising Film Festival in Kraków)
 1998 – Award (Cinematography Award for the "Mobil 1" commercial at the "Creatura" Warsaw Advertising Festival)

Personal life 
He is a father of the film operator and music producer Michał Dąbal vel Ajron.

References 

1955 births
Polish cinematographers
People from Tarnowskie Góry County
Living people